Exfoliation (from the term "foliate", meaning “related to leaves”) means the removal or loss of leaves from a plant.  It is used both to describe the loss of a leaves as a natural part of a plant's life cycle (such as in the case of deciduous trees which lose their leaves in the autumn) or because of some trauma or outside cause (such as dehydration, an infestation of caterpillars or hurricane-force winds).

In arboriculture, the term “exfoliating bark” describes the natural process and condition of the bark peeling-away from a tree trunk, typically in large pieces that remain partially attached to the trunk until such time as they are completely detached by the elements or the eventual and subsequent exfoliation of additional layers of bark.  Examples of trees with exfoliating bark are the paperbark maple and various species of Plane (Sycamore) and birch.

See also

 Bark peeling by deer

Plant physiology
Plant anatomy
Plant morphology